Christiaan le Cordier "Chris" Rossouw (born 14 September 1969) is a retired South African rugby union player, usually positioned at hooker.

Playing career
In 1989 he was selected for the South Africa under-20 team.

He won 9 caps with the Springboks, with his debut test match against Western Samoa on 13 April 1995 at Ellis Park in Johannesburg. Rossouw represented South Africa at the 1995 and the 1999 Rugby World Cups.

Test history
 World Cup Final

See also
List of South Africa national rugby union players – Springbok no. 624
List of South Africa national under-18 rugby union team players

References

South African rugby union players
South Africa international rugby union players
Rugby union hookers
1969 births
Living people
Sharks (Currie Cup) players
Sharks (rugby union) players
Golden Lions players
Rugby union players from Mpumalanga